Peter Chadwick (born John Peter Granville Chadwick, 8 November 1934, Pateley Bridge, Yorkshire, England) was an English first-class cricketer, who played six matches for Yorkshire County Cricket Club between 1960 and 1965.  A right-handed batsman, he scored 106 runs at 17.66 with a top score of 59 against Middlesex.  He took two wickets with his right arm medium pace against Derbyshire.

He also played for Yorkshire's Second XI from 1958 to 1963, and Derbyshire's Second XI in 1963.

References

External links
Cricinfo Profile
Cricket Archive Statistics

1934 births
Yorkshire cricketers
People from Pateley Bridge
Living people
English cricketers
Sportspeople from Yorkshire